Buddhism is a minority religion in Switzerland. According to the 2000 census, 21,305 Swiss residents (0.29% of the total population) self-identified as Buddhists. About a third of them were born in Thailand.

History
Interest in Buddhism in Switzerland emerged at the beginning of the 20th century, sparked by allusions to the religion by Theosophy and some philosophical schools. An early Buddhist center was established in Lausanne, around 1910, by the German monk Nyanatiloka. In the 1920s and 1930s, a number of groups were formed in the regions around Zurich and Lausanne. A Buddhist group in Zurich, founded in 1942, published for many years the Buddhist journal Die Einsicht. In the 1970s, a group in French-speaking Switzerland was formed in Lausanne by Georges Bex, who had been ordained a monk in Thailand. During the same period, various Buddhist schools were established in Switzerland, notably Pure Land Buddhism, in Geneva and Yverdon, and in 1978 the Swiss Buddhist Union (Schweizerische Buddhistische Union / Union bouddhiste suisse  / Unione Buddhista Svizzera) was founded. 

Immigration from Asian countries, mostly from Cambodia, Thailand, Tibet and Vietnam resulted in the multiplication of Buddhist centers in Switzerland. Tibetan Geshe Rabten founded in 1977, in Mont Pèlerin, a Buddhist monastery and study centre for European monks, nuns and lay people as well. Switzerland also has Tibetan-Buddhist and Zen monasteries, among them the Tibet Institute Rikon located in Zell-Rikon im Tösstal in the Töss Valley in the canton of Zürich.

In 2003 the Theravada temple Wat Srinagarindravararam in Gretzenbach was dedicated by Princess Galyani Vadhana, the daughter of the Princess Mother Srinagarindra, after whom the temple was named.

In earlier censuses, Buddhism figured together with other non-Abrahamic traditions (mainly Hinduism) as "other churches and communities". These accounted for 0.12% in 1970, 0.19% in 1980, 0.42% in 1990 and 0.78% in 2000 (0.38% Hinduism, 0.29% Buddhism, 0.11% other).

References

 2000 census results (Swiss federal statistics office)

Further reading
 Baumann, Martin (2000). "Buddhism in Switzerland", Journal of Global Buddhism 1, 154-159.
 Weigelt, Frank-André (2009). "Dokumentation: Buddhismus in der Schweiz. Eine Kurzdarstellung", Schweizerische Kirchenzeitung 45, 774-778

See also
Nyanatiloka Mahathera
Wat Srinagarindravararam
Santacittarama, Italy
Buddhism in Germany
Buddhism in France
Buddhism in Italy
Buddhism in Iceland
Religion in Switzerland
Tibetan Swiss

External links 
 Schweizerische Buddhistische Union
 Alois Payer
 Martin Baumann
 Buddhactivity Dharma Centres database

 
Switzerland
Buddhism in Europe
Religion in Switzerland